A follower of Swaminarayan is referred to as a Satsangi

Satsangi life

Kanthi
A kanthi is a double stranded necklace made of tulsi. Female satsangis are initiated by the wife of the acharya, who is the leader of women in the Swaminarayan Sampradaya. Female members of BAPS are generally initiated by senior women followers and males are initiated at the hands of a sadhu or senior male devotees.

See also 
 Swaminarayan
 Swaminarayan Sampradaya

References 

Swaminarayan Sampradaya